Kshitij Ye Nahi is a 13-episode show broadcast on Doordarshan in the early 1990s.

Synopsis 
Supriya Pilgaonkar plays the protagonist, a young widow who lives with her 10-year-old daughter and her father-in-law (Vikram Gokhale). Some flashback scenes show her husband (Rajit Kapur), who had died. Tushar Dalvi plays her new love interest in the series.

Cast 
 Supriya Pilgaonkar as Nisha
 Tushar Dalvi as Shekhar 
 Rajit Kapur as Akshay
 Vikram Gokhale as Akshay's Father
 Anuj Saxena

References 

DD National original programming
1990s Indian television series